Ahmed Shambih (Arabic:أحمد شمبيه) (born 20 December 1993) is an Emirati footballer. He currently plays as a goalkeeper for Al Nasr.

External links
 
 Player's Profile Page at UAEFA website

References

Emirati footballers
1993 births
Living people
Al-Nasr SC (Dubai) players
Footballers at the 2014 Asian Games
Place of birth missing (living people)
Association football goalkeepers
UAE Pro League players
Asian Games competitors for the United Arab Emirates